Muhammad bin Yusuf Al-Hussaini (7 August 1321 − 10 November 1422), commonly known as Banda Nawaz Gaisu Daraz, was a Hanafi Maturidi scholar and Sufi saint from India of the Chishti Order.

Gaisu Daraz was a disciple and then successor of Sufi saint Nasiruddin Chiragh Dehlavi. When he moved to Daulatabad around 1400, owing to the attack of Timur on Delhi, he took the Chishti Order to South India. He finally settled down in Gulbarga, at the invitation of Bahmani Sultan, Taj ud-Din Firuz Shah.

In Delhi
AlHussaini left Delhi on December 17, 1398, because the city was under siege by Timur and its fall was imminent.

Works
Bande Nawaz wrote 195 books in Arabic, Persian and Urdu. He also composed a book on the Prophet of Islam titled Miraj-al Ashiqin for the instruction of the masses in Dakhni, a South Indian branch of the Urdu language. He was the first Sufi to use this vernacular which was elaborated upon by many other Sufi saints of South India in later centuries. He wrote many treatises on the works on Ibn Arabi and Suhrawardi, which made the works of these scholars accessible to Indian scholars and played a major role in influencing later mystical thought. Other books authored are Qaseeda Amali and Adaab-al-Mureedein.

Urs

His death anniversary takes place on 15, 16 and 17 Dhu al-Qadah at the Bande Nawaz mausoleum in Gulbarga. Several hundred thousand people from different religions gather to seek blessings.

In popular culture 
Indian Muslim social films revolving around the saint and his dargah have been made. These include: Sultan E Deccan: Banda Nawaz (1982) by Malik Anwar, Banda Nawaz (1988) by Saini.

See also
 Sufism in India

References

Bibliography
 Askari, Syed Hasan, Tazkira-i Murshidi—Rare Malfuz of the 15th-Century Sufi Saint of Gulbarga. Proceedings of the Indian Historical Records Commission (1952).
 Hussaini, Syed Shah Khusro, Gisudaraz on Wahdat al-Wujud. Studies in Islam 19 (1982), pp. 233–45.
 Hussaini, Syed Shah Khusro, Sayyid Muhammad al-Husayni Gisu Daraz: On Sufism Delhi: Idarah-i Adabiyat-i Delli, 1985.
 Hussaini, Syed Shah Khusro, Shuhud vs. Wujud: A Study of Gisudiraz Islamic Culture 59 (1985), pp. 323–39.
 Siddiqi, Mohd. Sulaiman, Syed Mohd. al-Husaini Gisudaraz Islamic Culture 52 (1978), pp. 173–84.
 Syed Shah Khusro Hussaini, "Gulbarga: Dargha of Hazrat Khwaja Bandanawaz Gisudaraz" in Mumtaz Currim, George Michell (Eds.), Darghas. Abodes of the Saint, Bombay, The Marg Foundation, 2004, 152 p. (ISBN 978-8-185-02665-7), p. 120-135

1321 births
1422 deaths
Chishti Order
Writers from Karnataka
Indian Sufi religious leaders
Indian Sufi saints
Urdu-language writers from India
Scholars from Karnataka
14th-century Indian scholars
15th-century Indian scholars
People from Kalaburagi
Critics of Ibn Arabi
Hanafis
Maturidis
14th-century Indian non-fiction writers
14th-century Indian people
14th-century Indian philosophers
14th-century Indian writers
15th-century Indian non-fiction writers
15th-century Indian people
15th-century Indian philosophers
15th-century Indian writers
Chishtis